Rudnik Drugi is a village in the administrative district of Gmina Zakrzówek, within Kraśnik County, Lublin Voivodeship, in eastern Poland.

The village has a population of 440.

References

Rudnik Drugi